Horace Joshua Cohen (born 15 October 1971) is an American-Dutch actor and comedian.

Career

Film 

Cohen made his debut at age 15 as Henkie in the 1986 film Flodder directed by Dick Maas. This role was played by other actors in sequels and the spin-off television series. Cohen did make an appearance in small roles in the television series.

In 2003, he played a role in the television film Brush with Fate.

In 2012, he played a role in the film Black Out directed by Arne Toonen. In 2019, he played a role in Amsterdam Vice (Baantjer: Het Begin), also by Arne Toonen. The film won the Golden Film award two weeks later after having sold 100,000 tickets.

Television 

Between 1991 and 1994 he played a small role in the soap opera Goede tijden, slechte tijden.

He was a contestant in 2003 in the television show Bobo's in the bush, the Dutch version of I'm a Celebrity...Get Me Out of Here!.

In 2010, he was one of the team captains in the television show Gehaktdag in which a Dutch celebrity is satirically critiqued by two teams.

In 2011, he was one of the contestants in Wie is de Mol? which took place in El Salvador and Nicaragua that year. He had to leave the show in the third episode. Since that year, his phrase "Trust nobody" is used in the show's introduction. In 2020, he appeared in a special anniversary edition of the show, called Wie is de Mol? Renaissance, which featured only contestants of previous seasons. This time, he also had to leave the show in the third episode.

In 2021, he appeared in the game show Code van Coppens - De Wraak van de Belgen in which teams need to escape from an escape room.

Theater 

In 2018, he took part in the 25th anniversary show of Boom Chicago.

Personal life 

Horace Cohen was born in New York City and raised in Amsterdam. He has a Jewish-American father and a Dutch mother.

He was previously in a relationship with Sanne Kraaijkamp, a daughter of John Kraaijkamp.

Cohen married his wife Puck in June 2017. They have a daughter, born in 2015, and a son, born in 2018. Cohen also has a daughter from a previous relationship.

Selected filmography 

 1986: Flodder
 2003: Brush with Fate
 2011: Amsterdam Heavy
 2012: Black Out
 2015: The Little Gangster
 2019: Amsterdam Vice (Baantjer: Het Begin)

References

External links 
 

1971 births
Living people
20th-century Dutch male actors
21st-century Dutch male actors
Dutch male comedians
Dutch male child actors
Dutch male film actors
Dutch male television actors
Dutch people of Jewish descent
Male actors from Amsterdam